This is an alphabetical list of known Hindi songs performed, sung and/or recorded by Mohammed Rafi between 1942 and 1980.  Over 5,000 of his songs are listed here. Mohammed Rafi also sang in several different languages other than Hindi such as Punjabi, Marathi etc.  Some of which are also listed here.

N 

(151)

 "Na Aadmi Ka Koi Bharosa (Solo - Naushad Ali/Shakeel Badayuni) - Aadmi II 1968"      [Teri Mohabbat Pe Shaq Nahin Hain Teri Wafaonko Manta Hoon Magar ...]
 "Na Ab Koi Khatara ..Mere Budhape Ko Tum Cash Karlo (Qawali Asha Bhosle and Manna Dey - Sonik-Omi) - Apna Khoon 1978"
 "Na Baba Na Bikaner Ka Ghaghra Choli  (Solo - N. Dutta aka Datta Naik/Shamshul Huda Bihari) - Aag Aur Daag 1971"
 "Na Bhanwra Na Koi Gul, Akela Hoon Main Tera Bulbul, Hain Ik Tanahai, Meri Jaan Mere Jahaan Mein Aa (Twist Asha Bhosle - Roshan Lal/Majrooh Sultanpuri) - Aarti II 1962"
 "Na De Ilzam Dil Unko (Solo - Roshan Lal) - Majboori 1985"
 "Na Dekho Humein Ghoor Ke Jadoogar Sainyan, Muchule Humara Jiya Le Ke Angadaiya, ..Mujhe Pe Bhi Dal Gori Zulfon Ki Chhaiyan, Main Wari Wari Jaoon Re Leke Ballaiyan (Duet Asha Bhosle -  Ravi/Shakeel Badayuni) - Gharana 1961"
 "Na Disen Toon (Punjabi - Hansraj Behl) - Sutlej De Kande **** or Punjabi Film Hits of M. Rafi 1950-1960"
 "Na Hanso Pyar Pe (Solo - S. Mohinder/Tanveer Naqvi) - Shirin Farhad 1956" 
 "Na Ho Mayoos ..Chal Musaafir Teri Manzil Dur Hai To Kya Hua (Solo - Kalyanji-Anandji) - Ganga Ki Saugand 1978"
 "Na Ja Kahin Ab Na Ja Dil Ke Siwa (Solo - Laxmikant-Pyarelal/Majrooh Sultanpuri) - Mere Hamdam Mere Dost 1968"
 "Na Ja Mere SAathi Na Ja (Solo - Sardar Malik/Bharat Vyas) - Saranga 1960"      [Aa Aa Aa ..SAath Jiyenge SAath Marenge Yeh Wada Kyun Tod Diya ...]
 "Na Jaane Kyun, Humare Dil Ko Tum Ne, Dil Nahin Samajha, Na Ja Ne Kyun, Yeh Shisha Tod Dala, Aa Aa ..Yeh Shisha Tod Dala, Pyar Ke Qabil Nahin Samajha, Na Ja Ne Kyun (Solo - O. P. Nayyar/Shamshul Huda Bihari) - Mohabbat Zindagi Hai 1966"   
 "Na Jaiyo Radhe Chhedenge Shyaam (Janmashthami Solo - Laxmikant-Pyarelal/Aanand Bakshi) - Sau Saal Baad 1966"
 "Na Jhat Ko Zulf Se Pani Yeh Moti Phoot Jayenge, Tumhara Kuch Na Bigadega Magar Dil Toot Jayenge (Solo - Ravi/Rajendra Krishan) - Shehnai 1964"
 "Na Kanne Hamsa Kalisindi (Telugu Solo - A. R. Rahman/Shastri) - Jodi ****"
 "Na Karoon Band Tere Chand (Duet Manna Dey - Laxmikant-Pyarelal/Aanand Bakshi) - Madhavi 1969"
 "Na Kisi Ki Aankh Ka Noor Hoon (Solo - Shri Nath Tripathi/Bahadur Shah Zafar) - Lal Quila 1960"
 "Na Kisi Ki Aankh Ka Noor Hoon Na Kisi Ke Dil Ka Qarar Hoon (Solo - Shri Nath Tripathi) - Lal Quila 1960"
 "Na Ko Bhavya Wada, Nako Gadi Ghoda, Anadi Aase Mee, Tujha Premveda (Marathi - Shrikant Thakre) - Rafi Smrutit Rahile Geet ****"
 "Na Koi Paisa Na Ilm (Solo - Vijay Raghav Rao/Yogesh Gaud) - Bansi Birju 1972"
 "Na Main Bhagwan Hoon Na Main Shaitan Hoon Are Duniya Jo Chahe Samajhe Main To Insaan Hoon (Solo - Naushad Ali/Shakeel Badayuni) - Mother India 1957"
 "Na Mano To Koi Shikayat Nahin (Duet Suman Kalyanpur - N. Dutta aka Datta Naik/Aziz Kashmiri) - Ustad 420 [Four Twenty] 1969"
 "Na Mukhda Mod Ke Jao Baharon Ke Din Hain Humein Gale Lagao Bahoron Ke Din Hain (Solo - Shankar-Jaikishan/Hasrat Jaipuri) - Chhoti Si Mulaqat 1967"
 "Na Na Gori, Chhod Mujhe, Mat Jana (Duet Kishore Kumar - Anil Biswas/Majrooh Sultanpuri) - Paisa Hi Paisa 1956"
 "Na Na Jaane Na Doongi (Duet Usha Mangeshkar - Rajesh Roshan/Anjaan) - Priyatama 1977"
 "Na Na Kar Te Pyar Tumhin Se Kar Baithe Kar Na Tha Inkaar Magar Ikraar Tumhin Se Kar Baithe (Duet Suman Kalyanpur - Kalyanji-Anandji/Anand Bakshi) - Jab Jab Phool Khile 1965"
 "Na Na Na Na Tuaba Tuaba, Main Na Pyar Karoongi, Main Na Pyar Karoongi, Kabhi Kisis Se Tauba Re Balam Tauba Tauba Are Wa Wa Wa Wa Aisa Kaisa Hoga Tauba Kaye Ko Karta, Tauba Kaye Ko Karta, Pyar Se Karta Aisa Re Sanam Kaisa Hoga (Duet Geeta Dutt - O. P. Nayyar/Majrooh Sultanpuri) - Aar Paar I 1954"      [Are ...]
 "Na Ro Bhai Na Ro Bhai Na … Kahin Chali Na Jaaye Meri Naukari Na Ro Bhai Na (Munna Duet Suman Kalyanpur - Roshan Lal/Shailendra) - Deep Jalta Rahe 1959"
 "Na Roko Ram Ko Logon (Solo - Shivram/Kavi Pradeep) - Shri Ram Bharat Milan 1965"
 "Na Rootho, Rootho Na Rootho Na Rootho Meri Jaan Isi Bahane Aaj Teri Meri Ho Gayi Pehchan (Duet Asha Bhosle - Shankar-Jaikishan/Hasrat Jaipuri) - Jawan Muhabbat 1971"
 "Na Rus Hirie Meriye Main Ranjhan Tera (Punjabi Solo - Surinder Kohli/Pawan Kumar) - Bemisaal Vol. 3 **** and Chann Pardesi ****"
 "Na Satrah Se Upar Na Solah Se Kam (Solo - Sonik-Omi/Verma Malik) - Dharma 1973"
 "Na Sharab Se Koi Wasta (Duet Bhupinder Singh - R. D. Burman/Majrooh Sultanpuri) - Salaam Memsaab 1979"
 "Na Shauq E-Wast Ka Dawaa (Urdu Ghazal Solo - Unknown/Unknown) - Mohd Rafi Ghazals Vol. 2 ****"
 "Na Tajshahi Na Badshahi (Solo - S. Mohinder/Tanveer Naqvi) - Shirin Farhad 1956"
 "Na Thahar Sake Na Tadap Sake 1 (Duet Zohrabai Ambalewali - Abid Hussain Khan-Sushant Bannerjee/Shareen Bhopali) - The Last Message 1949"
 "Na Thamte Hain Aansoo, Na Rukte Hain Naale, Teri Zindagani, Hain Gham Ke Hawaale, Na Thamti Hain Aansoo, Na Rukte Hain Naale, Na Thamti Hain Aansoo (Solo - Husnlal-Bhagatram/Qamar Jalalabadi) - Meena Bazaar 1950"
 "Na To Carvan Ki Talash Hain, Na To HumSafar Ki Talash Hain (Qawali Multi Manna Dey, Shiv Dayal Batish and Asha Bhosle - Roshan Lal/Sahir Ludhianvi) - BarsAat Ki RAat 1960"      [Aa Aa Aa ...]
 "Na To Pita Ka Pyar Milega (Duet Geeta Dutt - Avinash Vyas/Bharat Vyas) - Aadhi Roti 1957"
 "Na Toofan Se Khelo, Na SAahil Se Khelo, Mere PAas Aao, Mere Dil Se Khelo (Solo - Naushad Ali/Shakeel Badayuni) - Uran or Udan Khatola 1954"      [Aa Aa Aa ..Sambhal Kar Khelna, Dariya Se Maujon Ki Rawani Mein, Jalenge Dil Hazaron, Aag Lag Jayegi Pani Mein ...] 
 "Na Tu Zameen Ke Liye Hain Na Aasmaan Ke Liye (Solo - Laxmikant Pyarelal/Sahir Ludhianvi) - Dastan 1972 and Mohammed Rafi Collection Vol. 10 ****" 
 "Na Tu Zamin Ke Liye Hai Na Aasman Ke Liye Tera Wajud ~~ Tera Wajud Hain Ab Sirf Dastaan Ke Liye  (Solo - Laxmikant-Pyarelal/Sahir Ludhianvi) - Dastaan 1972"
 "Na Tujh Se Dur Ja Saka (Solo - Laxmikant-Pyrelal/Anand Bakshi) - Pocketmaar 1974"
 "Na Ye Zameen Thi Na Aasman Tha Na Chand Taron Ka Neeshan Tha Magar Yeh Such Hain Ke Un Dino Bhi Tera Mera Pyar Yun Hin Jawaan Tha (Duet Asha Bhosle - Ravi/Rajendra Krishan) - Sagaai 1966"
 "Naach Uthe Sansaar (Duet Lata Mangeshkar - Laxmikant-Pyarelal/Majrooh Sultanpuri) - Naach Uthe Sansaar 1976"
 "Naadan Na Ban O Matwale (Solo - Jamal Sen/ShamShul Huda Bihari) - Rangeela 1953"
 "Naag Devta (Solo - R. D. Burman/Anand Bakshi) - Shalimar 1978 and Evergreen Mohd Rafi ****"
 "Naam Abdul Hain Mera Kya Sab Ki Khabar Rakhta Hoon (Solo - R. D. Burman/Anand Bakshi) - Shaan 1980 and Evergreen Mohd Rafi ****"      [Yaari… Aate Jaate Huye ]
 "Naam Hain Mera Banto Jatti (Multi Manna Dey, Meenu Purushottam and Asha Bhosle - Sonik-Omi/Verma Malik) - Sazaa 1972"
 "Naam Hain Mere Baap Ka Soda (Solo - B. S. Kalla/Pandit Indra) - Do Dulhe 1955" 
 "Naam Hain Mister Jhatpat ...Jaadugar Bangaale Ka (Solo - Husnlal-Bhagatram/Pyare Lal Santoshi) - Dushman 1957"
 "Naam Hari Ka, Jee Se Pyara (Prayer Solo - Sardar Malik/Qamar Jalalabadi) - Chamak Chandni 1957"
 "Naam Nahin, Koi Dhaam Nahin, Hain Number Se Pehchan, Kya Raja Kya Rank, Yahan Pe Sab Hain Ek Samaan (Solo - Shankar-Jaikishan/Gulshan Bawra) - Aan Baan II 1972"            [Soon Lo Purab Paschim Uttar Dakshin Ke Aey Logo, Jivan Mein Sab Ke Liye Sazaa Hain Hanste Hanste Bhogo ...]
 "Naam Ram Se Zyada Bhai (Solo - Parmathi-Ashwatham/Sant Kabir) - Ram Aur Rahim 1968"
 "Naam Tera Loon To Mujh Ko Insaan Tera (Solo - Narayan/S. P. Kalla) - Aastik 1956" 
 "Naari Tere Jivan Ki Yeh Karun Kahani Man Mein Hain Lagi Aag To Aankhon Mein Hain Paani, Naari Tere Jiwan Ki Yeh Karun Kahani Man mein Hain Lagi Aag To Aankhon Mein Hain Paani, Aankhon Mein Hain Paani (Solo - Chitragupt/Anjum Jaipuri) - Veer Babruwahan 1950"
 "Naav Kagaz Ki Gehra Hain Paani 1 (Duet Lata Mangeshkar - Shankar-Jaikishan/Vishwshwar Sharma) - DuniyaDari 1977"
 "Nach Badal Do Rang Badal Do Zamana Badla Gaya (Qawali Duet S. Balbir - Iqbal Qureshi/Aziz Kaisi) - Zamana Badal Gaya 1961"
 "Nach Sohniyan Mere Yaar Di Baraate (Punjabi Solo Barat - Sardul Kwatra/Manu Dilber) - 50 Glorious Years Of Punjabi Film Music Vol. 3**** and Do Posti 1981"
 "Nache Man Mora Magan (Classical Solo - S. D. Burman/Shailendra) - Meri Surat Teri Ankhen 1963"      [Aa Aa Aa ...]
 "Nache More Angana (Duet Kishore Kumar - Madan Mohan Kohli/Rajendra Krishan) - Mastana 1954"
 "Nacho O O O Un ..Kha Gaye Fal Ho Gayi Barbadiyan Shahjadon Se Ban Gaye Shahjadiyan ..Aane Lagi Ab To Sharam ..Kya Hua Yeh Mujhe Kya Hua (Funny S. Balbir and Surender Kohli - Hansraj Behl) - Gul Bakwali 1963 (Tajmulik-Bakwali, A Medieval Romance)"      [O O O O O O ...]
 "Nacho Rang Udayo Holi Hain (Holi Duet Krishna Kalle - Vithal Mumtaz/Javed Qadri) - Dukh Sukh 1974"
 "Nadan Hain Samjhte Nahin (Duet Shamshad Begum - Iqbal/Tabishi Kanpuri) - Fauladi Mukka 1965"
 "Nadi Ka Kinara (Multi Manhar Udhas and Shamshad Begum - Ganesh/Hasrat Jaipuri) - Shararat 1972"
 "Nadi Kinare (Multi Talat Mahmood and Shamshad Begum - Naushad Ali) - Baabul 1950"      [Jhingola, Jhingola, Jhing Jho Layi, ..Hai Ho Rabba Hai Ho Nadiya Men Utha Hai Shor Chhayi Hai Ghata Ghanaghor Jaana Door Hai ...]
 "Nadi Kinarein Koi Pukarein (Duet Geeta Dutt - Shri Nath Tripathi/Bharat Vyas) -Chandramukhi 1960"
 "Nadiya Kinare Mora Dera (Multi Geeta Roy and Shamshad Begum - Chitragupt/Ram Murti) - Tarang 1952"
 "Nadiya Mein Utha Hain Shor, Chhayi Hain Ghata Ghanghor, Thikana Door Han Hai To Tumba Hai To Tumba Hai Aa Aa Ha Ha (Multi Talat Mahmood and Shamshad Begum - Naushad Ali/Shakeel Badayuni) - Babul 1950"      [Jingola Jingola Jingola Jin-Go-Lai ..Hai To Tumba ..Hai To Tumba ...]  
 "Nadiyan Ke Pani Mein Haye Re Hay Jawani Dekho Aag Lagati Hai (Solo - Sonik-Omi/Rajendra Krishan) - Teen Chor 1973"
 "Nafrat Ki Duniya Ko Chhod Ke Khush Rehna Mere Yaar (Solo - Laxmikant-Pyarelal/Anand Bakshi) - Haathi Mere Saathi 1971 and Mohammed Rafi Collection Vol. 10 ****"
 "Nagama Humara (Duet Lata Mangeshkar - R. D. Burman/Majrooh Sultanpuri) -Bundle Baaz 1976 and Evergreen Mohd Rafi ****"
 "Nagan Sa Roop Hain Tera (Duet Hema Malini - Laxmikant-Pyarelal) - Baghawat 1982"      [Pani Mein Aag Dekho Kaise Laga Rahi Hain Kaun Kaun Hain Yahan Gora Badan Chhopa Ke Gori Naha Rahi Hain ..Aakash Ki Pari Hain Ya Koi Aur Hain Tu Ladki Nahin Hain Zalim Resham Ki Dor Hain Tu ..Nagan Ko Dor Kahe Reha Hain Tu ...]
 "Nahin Ji Zara Zara (Duet Lata Mangeshkar - C. Ramchandra/Rajender Krishan) - Khazana 1951"      [Mujhe Tum Se Bahot Hai Pyar….]
 "Nahin Koi Jagah Meri Na Katon Mein (Duet Asha Bhosle - Ravindra Jain/Kulwant Jani) - Maha Badmaash 1977"
 "Nahin Ris Punjabi Di (Solo - Sardul Kwatra/Sahrai) - Mirza Sahiban 1957"
 "Nahin Sudhrenge, Nahin Nahin Sudhrenge ..[Whistle] La La La ..Sansaar Ko Sudhaarenge Auron Ke Bozz Utaarenge, Par Hum Nahin Sudhrenege Nahin Nahin Sudhrenge Kabhi Hum Nahin Sudhrenge (Chachacha - Ravindra Jain) - Hum Nahin Sudhrenge 1980"
 "Nain Lad Gayi Hai To Manva Ma Kasak Hoyi Bay 1 (Solo - Naushad Ali) - Ganga Jamuna 1961"      [Rojgaar ..Hoyi Gava Saara Chowpat Mora Rojgaar O O O  ...] 
 "Nain Lad Jai Hein To (Solo - Naushad Ali/Shakeel Badayuni) - Ganga Jamuna 1961"      [Laaga Gori Gujariya Se Neha Humar Huyi Gawa Mora Sara Rojgaar ...]
 "Nain Mila Kar Chain Churana Kis Ka Hain Yeh Kaam, Are Hum Se Poochho Hum Ko Pata Hain Us Zalim Ka Naam (Solo - Kalyanji-Anandji/Anand Bakshi) - Aamne Saamne I 1967"
 "Nain Nasheele Honth Gulabi, Mukhada Gora Gora, Roop Tera Hain, Chalake Jaise Rus Ke Bhara Katora, Mera Reh Reh Ke Dil Machale, Allah Ji Mera Reh Reh Ke Dil Machale, Dekh Akeli Samajh Ke Bholi Kaahe Dale Dore, Haath Nahin Main Aanewali Sun Le O Munh Dhole, Chahe Dil Mein Gulaab Jale Haaye Chahe Dil Mein Gulaab Jale (Bhangara Duet Kamal Barot - Sardul Kwatra/Bismil Ludhianvi) - Kala Chashma 1962"
 "Nain Se Nain Mila (Duet Usha Timothy - Babu Singh/Madhukar Bihari) - Vidhyarti 1966"
 "Naina Chaar Karna (Duet Asha Bhosle - Nashad Ali/Faruk Kaiser) - Qatil 1960" ( (Nashad Ali was also known as Shaukat Ali, Shaukat Haidari, Shaukat Dehlvi, Shaukat Husain and Shaukat Husain Haidari.)
 "Nainon Ke Teer Jidhar Toot Pade (Duet Asha Bhosle - Nisar Bazmi/Saba Afghani) - Halla Gulla 1954"      [O O O O O O ...] 
 "Nainon Mein Kajara Maasha Allah Baalon Mein Gajara Subhaan Allah (Solo - Jani Babu Qawwal/Saba Afgani) - Noor Mahal 1965"
 "Nainon Mein Suraj Ki Kirane (Duet Asha Bhosle - O. P. Nayyar/Shamshul Huda Bihari) - Basant 1960"
 "Nainon Se Mad Madira Pilakar (Duet Nirmala Devi - Shankar Rao Vyas/Ramesh Gupta) - Ghunghat 1946"
 "Nainon Wali Tere Naina Jadoo Kar Gaye Teer Ban Ke Mere Sine Mein Ootar Gaye (Swing Solo - Shankar-Jaikishan/Shailendra) - Beti Bete 1964"
 "Naiya Jaldi Le Chalo Mujhe Saiyan Ke Angana Us Ke Liye Daud ke Le Aaya Hoon Main Kangana ..Tulsi Ke Pyar Mein Ratna Diwani (Engagement Duet Asha Bhosle - Chitragupt/Gopal Singh Nepali) - Tulsidas 1954"      [Hun Hun Hun ..O O O ...] 
 "Naiya Ka Meri Tu Hi Khivaiyya Din Dayala Krishna Kanhaiyaa Naiya Ka Meri Tu Hi Khivaiyya (Business Prayer Solo - Salil Chowdhury/Ineevar) - Zamana 1957"      [O O O O O ….Naiya Ka Meri Tu hi Khevayya ...] 
 "Naiya Meri Chalti Jai (Solo - Naushad Ali/Hasrat Jaipuri) - My Friend 1974"
 "Naiya Teri Mazdar Hoshiyar Hoshiyar (Business - Shankar-Jaikishan/Shailendra) - Awaara 1952"      [Ho Haiya, Haiya, Ho Haiya, Haiya, Ho Haiya, Haiya ...]
 "Nakharein Dikhla Ke Le Liya (Duet Shamshad Begum - Ghulam Mohammed/Shakeel Badayuni) - Nazneen 1951" 
 "Nako Aarti Ki Nako Pushpa-mala (Marathi Prayer Solo - Shrikant Thakare/Vandana Vitankar) - Gajleli Bhaktigeete Vol ?? ****"
 "Nako Bhavya Wada Nako Gaadi Ghoda Anadi Ase Me Tujha Premweda (Marathi Solo - Shrikant Thakare/Umakant Kanekar) - Amar Sangeet - Shrikant Thakare Vol. 1 ****"
 "Namaste Ji Namaste Ji Humra Tumhra Jeevan Beete Hanste Hanste Ji (Multi Shamshad Begum and Zohrabai Ambalewali - Husnlal-Bhagatram/Nazim Panipati) - Naach 1949"     
 "Namaste Pehle To Ho Gayi Namaste (Multi Chitalkar, Mohantara Talpade and Shamshad Begum - C. Ramchandra/Rajendra Krishan) - Patanga 1949"
 "Namkeen Tumhari Surat Hain (Multi Shamshad Begum and Zohrabai Ambalewali - Govind Ram/) - Jalpari 1952" 
 "Nange Baazu Nangee Ranen, Husn Ka Yeh Maiaaz Nahin, Kuriyani Se Lut Ko Uthaun, Ruh Meri Bimaar Nahin (Solo - Ravi/Rajendra Krishan) - Yeh Zindagi Kitni Hassen Hai 1966"
 "Nanhe Munne Bachche Teri Muthhi Mein Kya Hain (Children Duet Asha Bhosle as Child - Shankar-Jaikishan/Shailendra) - Boot Polish 1954"
 "Nao Kagaz Ki Gehra Hai Paani Zindagi Ki Yahin Hai Kahani (Duet Lata Mangeshkar - Shankar-Jaikishan) - Duniyadari 1977"
 "Naram Naram Ye Garam Garam Channe (Food Solo - Jamal Sen/Shamshul Huda Bihari) - Rangeela 1953"
 "Narayan Ki Isi Murti Se Hoga (Solo - P. Nageshwar Rao/Saraswati Kumar Deepak) - Bhagwan Balaji 1961"
 "Narazagi Yeh Aap Ki (Duet Suman Kalyanpur - Rajesh Roshan/Amit Khanna) - Unees Bees 1980"
 "Naseeb Dar Pe Tere Aazmane Aaya Hoon ..Tujhi Ko Teri Kahani Sunane (Solo - Naushad Ali/Shakeel Badayuni) - Deedar 1951"
 "Naseeb Mein Jiske Jo Likha Tha (Solo - Ravi/Shakeel Badayuni) - Do Badan 1966"
 "Nasha Sharab Mein Hota (Solo - Usha Khanna/Hasrat Jaipuri) - Munimji 1972"
 "Nashe Mein Hum Nashe Mein Tum Kya Khabar Dil Kidhar Ho Gaya Hain Goom (Swing Duet Suman Kalyanpur - N. Dutta aka Datta Naik/Jan Nisar Akhtar) - Black Cat 1959"
 "Nashili Hawa Hain Sama Hain Gulabi (Duet Asha Bhosle - Roshan Lal/Anand Bakshi) - Commercial Pilot Officer 1963"
 "Nath Chehre Pe Saja Le (Solo - Mandheer-Jatin/Aish Kanwal) - Dil Hi Dil Mein 1982"
 "Naujawano Bharat Ki Taqdeer Bana Do, Naujawano Bharat Ki Taqdeer Bana Do, Phoolon Ke Iss Gulshan Se, Kaanton Ko Hata Do, Phoolon Ke Iss Gulshan Se, Kaanton Ko Hata Do, Naujawano, Naujawano, Naujawano (Patriotic Solo - Ghulam Mohammad/Shakeel Badayuni) - Kundan 1955"      [Naujawano, Naujawano, ...]   
 "NavKalpana Nav Roop Se Rachana (Classical Solo - Shambhu Sen/Shambhu Sen) - Mrig Trishna 1975"
 "Nayan Chakchoor Chhe  (Gujarati Duet Lata Mangeshkar - Avinash Vyas/Avinash Vyas) -  Geet Gunjan ****"
 "Nayan Tumharein (Solo - Narayan/S. P. Kalla) - Aastik 1956"
 "Nayi Seeta Ki Suno Nayi Kahani Dharti Ki Beti Sab Dukh Sahati (Solo - Sardar Malik/Bharat Vyas) - Roop Sundari 1964"
 "Nayi Zindagi Se Pyar Kar (Duet Lata Mangeshkar - Shankar-Jaikishan/Shailendra) - Shikast 1953"
 "Nazaaron Ne Maara Hum Kya Karein (Solo - Chitragupt/Prem Dhawan) - Zimbo Shaher Mein aka Zimbo Comes To Town 1960"
 "Nazaaron Se Kheloon Bahron Se Kheloon Mera Bas Chale Chand Taron Se Kheloon (Duet Ameerbai Karnataki - Ameerbai Karnataki/Akhtar Pilibhiti) - Shahnaz 1948"      [O O O O O O ...]
 "Nazaaron Se Nazar Ka Takrana (Duet Pramodini Desai - Baldev Nath Bali/Muzzafar Orkazai) - Fariyaadi 1953" 
 "Nazar Aati Nahin Manzil 2 (Solo - Ravindra Jain/Ravindra Jain) - Kaanch Aur Heera 1972 and Down Memory Lane -Mohammad Rafi ****"
 "Nazar Bachakar Chale Gaye Woh Warna Ghayal Kar Deta (Solo - Shankar-Jaikishan/Hasrat Jaipuri) - Dil Tera Diwana 1962"
 "Nazar Ka Yeh Paighaam (Duet Lata Mangeshkar - Laxmikant-Pyarelal/Majrooh Sultanpuri) - Barkha Bahar 1973"
 "Nazar Mein Bijli, Ada Mein Shole, Janabe Aali Na Sadke Janwaan, Zara Palat Ke Idhar To Dekho, Zara Palat Ke Idhar To Dekho, O Gussewali Na Sadke Janwaan (Solo - Shankar-Jaikishan/Farooq Qaiser) - Prince 1969"
 "Nazar Milayi To Duniya Se Darna Kya (Duet Asha Bhosle - S. D. Burman) - Ek Ke Baad Ek 1959"      [O Aa Aa ...]
 "Nazar Mili Hain Ek Qatil Se (Duet Asha Bhosle - S. Mohinder/Shakeel Nomani) - Reporter Raju 1962"
 "Nazar Na Lag Jaye Kisi Ki Rahon Mein, Chhupa Ke Rakh Lono Aa Tujhe Nigahon Mein, O My Love (Swing Solo - Laxmikant-Pyarelal/Anand Bakshi) - Night In London 1967"      [O My Love O O ...]
 "Nazar Ne Luta Hain, Ada Ne Mara Hain, Haseenon Ka Yeh Dhokha Bhi, Bada Hi Pyara Hain, Agar Yeh Dhokha Tha, To Kis Ne Roka Tha, Laga ke Dil, Yeh Kehte Ho, Ke Dil Bechara Hain (Duet Lata Mangeshkar - Chitragupt/Prem Dawan) - Police Detective 1960"
 "Nazar Yeh Teri Teekhi (Duet Asha Bhosle - G. S. Kohli/Jan Nisar Akhtar) - Mr. India 1961"
 "Nazariya Na Maro (Solo - Sardar Malik/Hasrat Jaipuri) - Bachpan 1963"
 "Nazron Ke Tir Mare Kus Kus Kus, Ek Nahin Do Nahin Aath Nau Dus ..Haan Ha Ha Ha ..Saiyan Main To Haar Gayee Bus Bus Bus (Duet Asha Bhosle - O. P. Nayyar/Qamar Jalalabadi) - Do Ustad 1959"  (Rafi Sings for Raj Kapoor)
 "Nazuk Nazuk Badan Mora (Duet Lata Mangeshkar - Chitragupt/Majrooh Sultanpuri) - Aulad II 1968"
 "Nede Eenade (Telagu Duet P. Susheela - T. V. Raju/Dr C Narayana Reddy) -  Kalavaramaaye Madhilo ****, Ntr - Memorable Hits and Dr. C Narayana Reddy - Golden Memoirs and  Golden Hour-ghantasala"
 "Nede Thelisindhi (Telagu Duet S. Janaki - S. Hanumantha Rao/DR. C. Narayana Reddy) - Aaradhana 1976 and Ntr - Romantic Hits"
 "Neekela Inta Niraasa (Telagu Solo - S. Hanumantha Rao/Dasarathy) - Aaradhana 1976"
 "Neel Gagan Par Udte Baadal Aa Aa Aa Dhoop Mein Jalta Khet (Duet Asha Bhosle - Ravi/Rajendra Krishan) - Khandaan 1965"      [O O O O O O Aa Ha Ha Aa Aa Aa Aa ...]
 "Neeli Neelii Ankhiyon Mein Doobi (Duet Suman Kalyanpur - Sardar Malik/Bharat Vyas) - Naag Mohini 1963"
 "Neend Udeygi Tera Chain Udeyga (Duet Asha Bhosle - Ravindra Jain/Ravindra Jain-Hasrat Jaipuri) - Ram Bharose 1977"
 "Neenelli Nadeve Doora (Kannada Solo - Satyam/Geetha Priyan) - Onde Balliya Hoogalu 1967"
 "Ni Chhori Ab Saari (Solo - Sonik-Omi) - Zamaanat 1977"
 "Ni Loot Len Aayi Goriye Ki Lut Jaayen Laakhon Haan (Multi Manna Dey and Asha Bhosle - Sonik Omi/Verma Malik) - Do Yaar 1972" 
 "Ni Soniye O Chhod Bedardi Aanchal Mera Chhod Bedardi Aanchal Mera Ho Gayi Main Bechain Ne Soniya Ne Soniya (Duet Lata Mangeshkar - R. D. Burman/Anand Bakshi) - The Train 1970"      [Mujh Se Bhala Yeh Kajal Tera ...]
 "Ni Sultana Re Pyar Ka Mausam Aaya (Duet Lata Mangeshkar - R. D. Burman/Majrooh Sultanpuri) - Pyar Ka Mausam 1969 and Mohammed Rafi Collection Vol. 9 ****"      [O O O O O O Aa Ha Ha Aa Aa Aa Aa ...]
 "Nigaahein Milane ko Ji Chaahta Hain (Ghulam Mohammad/Tanveer Naqvi) - Parai Aag 1948"
 "Nigaahein Ruk Gayi Kaise Baje Dil Ka Sitar (Duet Shamshad Begum - Naushad Ali/Shakeel Badayuni) - Chandni Raat 1949"
 "Nigahein Shauk Se, Keh Do Humein SalAam Karein, Humare Ishq Ki Duniya ..Karein,  (Qawali Duet Asha Bhosle - Ravi/Shakeel Badayuni) - Wanted 1961"      [Aa Aa Aa ...] 
 "Nigah-E-Mehar Hum Se Aaj Be-takati Phirti Hain, Kis Ki Kuchh Nahin Chalti Hian, Jab Tak Teer Phirti Hain, Sitam Bhi Tumharein, Karam Bhi Tumharein ..Kis Ko Pukare Haaye Kis Ko Pukare (Duet Asha Bhosle - Malay Chakraborty/Allama Arzoo Lakhnavi) - Mukti 1959" 
 "Nigahon Ne Phenka Hai Panche Pe Chhakka Balam Tera Mera Hua Pyar Pakka (Card Game Asha Bhosle - O. P. Nayyar/Anjaan) - Jaali Note 1960"
 "Night in London, Night In London, Night In London, Aa Ha Ha Night In London ..Zulfon Ki Kahani Hain, Jannat Ki Nishani hain, Nagamon Ki Jawani Hain Dilkash Hain, Suhaani Hain (Duet Lata Mangeshkar - Laxmikant-Pyarelal/Anand Bakshi) - Night In London 1967"  
 "Nir Ta Ta Dhang Ae Ae Ae .. (Classical Duet Manna Dey - R. D. Burman/Anand Bakshi) - Chandan Ka Palna 1967"
 "Nirdhan Ka Ghar Lootnewalon Loot Lo Dil Ka Pyaar Pyaar Woh Dhan Hain Jis Ke Aaage Sab Dhan Hain Bekaar Insaan Bano Kar Lo Bhalai Ka Koi Kaam (Solo - Naushad Ali) - Baiju Bawra 1952"
 "Nothing Is Impossible Now (Multi Kishore Kumar and Bappi Lahiri - Bappi Lahiri/Gauhar Kanpuri) - Zakhmee 1975"
 "Nukta Chin Hain Gham E Dil Muj Ko Sunaye Na Bane (Urdu Ghazal Solo - Khaiyyaam/Mirza Ghalib) - Mohd Rafi Ghazals Vol. 2 **** and Finest Ghazals ****"

See also 
 List of songs recorded by Mohammed Rafi

N
Rafi, Mohammed